The EOS 1D Mark III is a professional 10.1 megapixel digital single lens reflex camera (DSLR) camera body produced by Canon. The EOS 1D Mark III was announced on February 21, 2007 and is the successor of the Canon EOS-1D Mark II N and was first released in May 2007. In late 2009, the camera was succeeded by the Canon EOS-1D Mark IV. One of the main benefits of the new Mark III, over the previous models, was the added functionality of Live view, allowing users to take pictures while looking at an LCD screen. While it had the same outdated software as the older 1D series cameras, it had a much improved button layout,  which is still used today. It also had improved wireless capabilities (with the optional WFT-E2 wireless adapter) over the Mark II. The new WFT-E2 was much smaller than the previous WFT-E1 for the Mark II. The new transmitter could now also connect via a USB port. This allowed the optional addition of a GPS unit and wired PC connectivity.

Features 
 28.1 × 18.7 mm APS-H CMOS sensor
 10.1 megapixel effective
 Dual DIGIC III image processors
 Canon EF lens mount (excludes EF-S)
 1.3x crop factor
 45-point TTL-AREA-SIR autofocus with a dedicated CMOS sensor
 TTL full aperture metering with 63 zone SPC
 100–3200 ISO speed equivalent (ISO can be expanded to L: 50 or H: 6400 with custom function)
 30–1/8000 sec. shutter speed and bulb
 Auto white balance
 Eye-level pentaprism viewfinder with approx. 100% coverage
 230,000 pixel (690,000 dot), 3.0" color TFT liquid-crystal monitor with approx. 100% coverage (for JPEG images)
 Live preview on the camera's rear LCD, also via an external system using Canons EOS Utility  (disables AF)
 E-TTL II flash mode with optional in-camera controls for the Speedlite 580EX II flash
 10 frames per second continuous shooting (JPEG: max. 110 frames, raw: max. 30 frames)
 Dimensions (WxHxD): 156 × 157 × 80 mm (6.1 × 6.2 × 3.1 in)
 Weight (body only): Approx. 1155 g
 Microphone for recording voice annotations

The camera's image sensor is a CMOS-based integrated circuit with Bayer filters for RGB color detection (Canon calls it single-plate, in contrast with three-CCD sensors). It has approximately 10.1 million effective pixels.  A non-removable optical anti-aliasing filter is located in front of the image sensor, which also vibrates as part of an anti-dust mechanism (similar to the one used in the entry-level Canon EOS 400D).

The shutter is an electronically controlled focal-plane shutter. Its maximum speed is 1/8,000 of one second. The shutter is operated by an electromagnet.

The Mark III is Canon's first professional Digital SLR to include a Live View feature, usually reserved for point-and-shoot cameras. The image is displayed on an electronic screen instead of in the viewfinder alone.

Awards 
The European Imaging and Sound Association (EISA) named the Canon EOS 1D Mark III the "European Professional Camera of the Year 2007-2008".

Problems 
Issues about Mark III cameras were reported throughout the online photographer communities after the camera's retail launch. These relate to SERVO AF mode, to stripes within the picture, cursor navigation failure, Err 99 messages and sub par low light focus acquisition performance compared to previous models. Canon investigated a few of these issues, and some are believed to be resolved in firmware release 1.1.1, which was released in September 2007.

Most significant of the issues is the autofocus (AF) issue; under certain conditions, (notably warm, bright, sunny days, conditions under which AF usually operates the best) photographer Rob Galbraith has reported poor AF performance. As of October 17, 2007, Canon technical representatives began stating the widely reported auto focus issue is suspected to be caused by an internal submirror assembly that requires replacement on most Cameras with serial numbers between 501001 and 546561 This correction has been made in production models dating to sometime shortly before the announcement of the fix.

As of August 2008, some reviewers have continued to note some level of remaining problems with AF both in the EOS-1D Mark III and EOS-1Ds Mark III even after the hardware and firmware fixes noted by Canon.

On March 3, 2009, Canon announced new firmware and a free AF recalibration for the 1D Mark III. Initial reports from owners who have received their camera back from the AF recalibration seem to be largely positive, although there are still some mixed results.

Firmware
This latest firmware available for the EOS-1D Mark III is version 1.3.2. The latest upgrades to the firmware for the Canon EOS-1D Mark III can be found on Canon's firmware download page.

Photographs of camera

See also 
Canon EF lens mount

References

External links 

 Canon EOS-1D Mark III Product Page at Canon USA
 Canon EOS-1D Mark III announcement, press release from Canon
 Video of Canon EOS-1D Mark III shooting at 10 frame/s
 Canon EOS-1D Mark III hands-on preview Preview from Imaging Resource

1D Mark III
Cameras introduced in 2007